Johannes Ducheyne (born 14 November 1933) is a Belgian basketball player. He competed in the men's tournament at the 1952 Summer Olympics.

References

1933 births
Living people
Belgian men's basketball players
Olympic basketball players of Belgium
Basketball players at the 1952 Summer Olympics
Place of birth missing (living people)